Eivor Varinsdottir is a fictional character in Ubisoft's Assassin's Creed video game franchise. She is the protagonist of the 2020 installment Assassin's Creed Valhalla, and first appeared in its prequel comic book, titled Song of Glory. Although canonically female, player may select Eivor's gender in the game, a plot point later revealed to be tied to Eivor's connection with Odin, who, within series lore, is depicted as a member of the Isu, an advanced civilization that pre-dates humanity. The female and male Eivor are portrayed by Danish actors Cecilie Stenspil and Magnus Bruun, respectively, through performance capture.

Within the series' alternate historical setting, Eivor is a Viking raider and shieldmaiden who lived during the Viking Age in the late 9th century. Born to a minor noble family in Norway, Eivor is adopted by King Styrbjorn of the Raven Clan after her biological parents are killed in a raid by a rival Viking clan, during which Eivor is attacked and scarred by a wolf, leading to her nickname of "Wolf-Kissed". The friendship between Eivor and her adoptive brother Sigurd is central to Valhalla's story, the events of which are set in motion when the siblings, dissatisfied with the Unification of Norway in 872, decide to leave their homeland and sail to England. There, they establish their own settlement called Ravensthorpe together with other loyalists in the Raven Clan, which Eivor subsequently attempts to expand by forming alliances with neighboring Saxon kingdoms and Viking clans. While doing so, she becomes acquainted with the Hidden Ones, a precursor organization to the Assassin Brotherhood, and agrees to help them fight the growing influence of their sworn enemies, the Order of the Ancients (precursors to the Templar Order, the series' perennial antagonists).

Eivor's character and both Stenspil's and Bruun's performances have been positively received by critics. Various merchandise of the character, as with other of the series' protagonists, has been released.

Character overview
Similarly to the previous two protagonists in the series, Bayek and Kassandra, Eivor has an animal companion: a female raven named Sýnin (Old Norse for "insight").

Development
The player has the choice of playing Eivor as either female or male (voiced by Cecilie Stenspil and Magnus Bruun respectively), or letting the game alternate between the two at key moments in the story (with the female avatar depicting Eivor's life and the male avatar depicting the physical appearance of the Isu Odin, due to his connection with Eivor). The player is also able to customize Eivor's hair, beard, war paint, clothing, armor, and tattoos. On the decision to allow players to select Eivor's gender, Thierry Noël, an advisor to the game, stated that while there was still historical debate to what degree women participated as warriors within  Viking society, Ubisoft believed that women featured prominently in both Norse mythology and society, and so sought to reflect the Viking idea that "women and men are equally formidable in battle". Some members of the Valhalla development team later stated that they had wanted the protagonist to be exclusively female and had selected the name "Eivor" as it was an exclusively female name in Nordic databases, but had been turned down by executives who believed that a female-only protagonist would be detrimental to total game sales.

Portrayal
When work on Assassin's Creed Valhalla began, both Eivor actors, Cecilie Stenspil and Magnus Bruun discussed their takes on the character, in a process that was both collaborative and independent. Bruun explained that "we agreed we’re building two different Eivors. It’s the same character but then again it’s not. All the material that you are processing as a gamer playing male or female Eivor is the same, but we are two different actors portraying the same character." Though they each agreed to approach the character in their own way and not allow each other to be influenced by what the other was doing, the actors noted that there were still some challenges to keep it relatively consistent for the animators. Bruun stated "we had to figure out how to make the animators happy, because if I did a whole four-hour session where Eivor had just been “ARGGGGGH” on lines where Cecilie had been more whispery that wouldn’t work. They animated the mouth, and also how the character moves. If they’re animating Eivor speaking slowly about loving horses, then the male voice comes in and just goes 'No I want to burn ARGGGGH' then it doesn’t fit and it’s fucked."

Bruun originally auditioned for the role of Sigurd in a fictional animated series called The Black Wolf Saga, and it was not revealed that it was for the next Assassin's Creed game until one of the final auditions, where he played both Sigurd and Eivor in front of five directors from Ubisoft. Ultimately, the role of Eivor was between Bruun and Gudmundur Thorvaldsson, who was given the role of Sigurd. In an interview, Bruun discussed how portraying the character of Cnut in television series The Last Kingdom helped to prepare him for the role of Eivor, noting that “The Viking spirit was inside me. They are two very different characters but then again they’re both leading Viking warlords, so the mindset is alike even though one is a hero and the other is portrayed as a self-serving baddie.” Bruun was already well-acquainted with the setting and subject matter of the game due to his Danish heritage and was given books by narrative director Darby McDevitt to aid his research.

Appearances

Assassin's Creed Valhalla
In Assassin's Creed Valhalla, the player experiences Eivor's life as part of a simulation played by another in-game character, Layla Hassan, who is searching for a way to save the Earth from destruction in the present-day and was led to Eivor's remains by a mysterious signal. Eivor was born in 847 in Norway to Varin, a minor nobleman, and his wife Rosta. When Eivor is eight years old, she witnesses her hometown of Heillboer being ransacked by the rival Wolf Clan, led by Kjotve the Cruel, during an althing to negotiate an alliance between Varin's clan and the Raven Clan, led by jarl Styrbjorn Sigvaldisson. After convincing Varin to surrender by promising to spare his people in return, Kjotve personally executes him (thus denying him entry in Valhalla), as well as Rosta. Eivor vows revenge against Kjotve before fleeing with Sigurd, Styrbjorn's son, though she is attacked and scarred by a wolf shortly after, causing her to experience a vision of the Isu Odin, as well as earn the nickname of "Eivor the Wolf-Kissed". Eivor is subsequently adopted by Styrbjorn, who raises her and Sigurd as siblings, leading to a lifelong friendship between the two, and continues to have visions of Odin, who directly communicates with her.

In 872, Eivor disobeys Stybjorn's orders and pursues vengeance against Kjotve. Although she fails and is taken prisoner, she manages to escape after retrieving her father's axe, leading to another vision of Odin. Eivor decides to consult the local seeress, Valka, who induces a vision of Sigurd losing an arm before being consumed by a giant wolf. Soon after, Sigurd returns home after a two-year expedition, accompanied by the Hidden Ones Basim Ibn Ishaq and Hytham, whom he met and befriended in Constantinople. Sigurd gifts Eivor a Hidden Blade, the signature weapon of the Hidden Ones, and secures an alliance with King Harald Fairhair to finally take down Kjotve, whom Eivor kills, avenging her parents. Afterwards, Harald calls an althing where he announces his plans to unify Norway under his rule. Most jarls pledge their loyalty to him, including Stybjorn, angering Sigurd, who expected to inherit the crown. He and Eivor take loyalists in the Raven Clan on an exodus to England, where they establish the settlement of Ravensthorpe from the remnants of an abandoned camp from the Great Heathen Army.

Over the following five years, Eivor strengthens Ravensthorpe by securing alliances with neighboring Saxon kingdoms and Viking clans, including those led by Ivar, Halfdan, Ubba Ragnarsson, Guthrum, and Ceolwulf of Mercia. She also builds up the settlement, attracting more settlers, including Valka, who continues to help Eivor deal with her visions, and learns about the Hidden Ones' struggle against the Order of the Ancients from Hytham. Hytham enlists Eivor's help in eliminating the Order's presence in England, which she accomplishes during her travels, thanks to tip-offs from a mysterious informant called "a Poor Fellow-Soldier of Christ." Notably, the hunt for one Order member, Kjotve's son Gorm, leads Eivor to Vinland, where she recovers an Isu Crystal Ball and leaves it in the care of the local Mohawk people.

After Sigurd and Basim find an Isu relic, the Saga Stone, the former comes to believe himself to be a god and distances himself from Eivor. Fulke, a member of the Order of the Ancients and servant of King Aelfred of Wessex, captures and tortures Sigurd, removing his right arm. Eivor and Basim kill Fulke and rescue a traumatized Sigurd. He and Eivor later travel back to Norway, where they uncover an Isu temple with an advanced tree-shaped computer system. The siblings connect to it and are seemingly transported to Valhalla, where they enjoy endless battle, until Eivor realizes it is all a simulation after seeing her father in Valhalla. Rejecting Odin's influence, who orders her to stay, Eivor escapes back to reality with Sigurd, only to be confronted by Basim, who reveals himself, Eivor, and Sigurd to be reincarnations of Loki, Odin, and Tyr, respectively. Basim, having been overtaken by Loki's personality, attacks Eivor, seeking revenge on Odin for imprisoning Loki's son Fenrir, but is defeated by Eivor and Sigurd and trapped in the computer simulation. Later, Eivor returns to England, where she and her allies join Guthrum's assault on Wessex, defeating Aelfred's forces at the Battle of Chippenham. Afterwards, Eivor tracks down Aelfred and learns that he is the Grand Master of the Order of the Ancients and the "Poor Fellow-Soldier of Christ", having helped Eivor dismantle the Order due to its heresy against Christianity. After Aelfred reveals his plans to reform the Order as a Christian organization (which would eventually become the Knights Templar), Eivor spares him and returns to Ravensthorpe to a hero's welcome. 

Eivor is also the protagonist of two of Valhalla's story-driven expansions: Wrath of the Druids, where she travels to Ireland to help her cousin Bárid mac Ímair earn the favor of the High King of Ireland, Flann Sinna, and dismantles a druid cult called the Children of Danu; and The Siege of Paris, where she heads to Francia to partake in the titular siege and neutralize the threat posed by Emperor Charles the Fat. Additionally, several free story updates released for Valhalla continue Eivor's story, including A Fated Encounter, which sees her encountering Assassin's Creed Odysseys protagonist Kassandra while they both search for an Isu artifact causing nightmares amongst the locals on the Isle of Skye; and The Last Chapter, set several years after the conclusion of the base game. Feeling she has done everything she could for Ravensthorpe, Eivor decides to better understand the nature of her connection with Odin, and leaves for Vinland after bidding farewell to her friends and allies. There, Eivor spends her final years in peace, conversing with Odin, who tells her about the Great Catastrophe that wiped out most of the Isu, and how he and his kind came to reincarnate themselves throughout the ages.

Other media
In addition to Valhalla, Eivor has also appeared in the comic book Assassin's Creed: Valhalla – Song of Glory, set before the events of the game, and the tie-in novel Assassin's Creed: Valhalla – Geirmund's Saga. Both the male and female versions of Eivor also appear as playable characters in Assassin's Creed: Rebellion, a mobile free-to-play strategy RPG action game.

Critical reception
Response to the character of Eivor has been largely positive. PC Gamer declared her as the series' best protagonist, specifically praising Stenspil's performance.

Notes

References

Assassin's Creed characters
Fictional archers
Fictional assassins in video games
Fictional axefighters
Fictional Vikings
Fictional explorers in video games
Fictional tribal chiefs
Fictional gladiators
Fictional gendarmerie personnel
Fictional pagans
Fictional swordfighters in video games
Female characters in video games
Fictional traceurs and freerunners
Video game characters introduced in 2020
Video game characters of selectable gender
Video game protagonists
Vigilante characters in video games
LGBT characters in video games
Role-playing video game characters
Woman soldier and warrior characters in video games